Cody Smith is an American politician and businessman serving as a member of the Missouri House of Representatives from the 163rd district. Elected in November 2016, he assumed office in January 2017.

Early life and education 
A native of Carthage, Missouri, Smith graduated from Carthage Senior High School. He studied business and commerce at Missouri Southern State University.

Career 
Outside of politics, Smith works as a real estate agent and owns a sanitization company. He is a member of the National Association of Realtors. Smith was elected to the Missouri House of Representatives in November 2016 and assumed office in January 2017. He also serves as chair of the House Budget Committee and chair of the Missouri General Assembly Joint Committee on Legislative Research.

After Missouri voters voted in favor of Medicaid expansion in a referendum, Smith led efforts to prevent the Missouri legislature from following the voters' wishes. Smith said, "Medicaid expansion is wrong for Missouri." He argued that Medicaid expansion would be fiscally irresponsible for Missouri, even though the federal government covers 90% of the cost for those covered under the expansion.

References 

Living people
Republican Party members of the Missouri House of Representatives
People from Carthage, Missouri
American real estate businesspeople
Year of birth missing (living people)